Myristica guadalcanalensis is a species of plant in the family Myristicaceae. It is endemic to the Solomon Islands.

References

guadalcanalensis
Endemic flora of the Solomon Islands
Near threatened plants
Near threatened biota of Oceania
Taxonomy articles created by Polbot